Tedi Medi Family is an Indian sitcom television series, which premiered on 8 June 2015 and is broadcast on BIG Magic. The series is adaptation of Warner Bros.' The Middle.

Reliance Broadcast Network had acquired the adaptation rights of the series. The series is produced by Mautik Tulip of Bodhi Tree Productions. The series is about a working-class family. The series is produced as a single-camera comedy and follows the daily commotion of raising a family, in the middle of life.

Cast
 Iqbal Azad as Vivek Khurana
 Ami Trivedi as Anjali Khurana
 Sushant Mohindru as Shanky Khurana
 Saloni Daini as Suhani Khurana
 Dharmik Joisar as Veer Khurana
 Manav Soneji as Vicky
 Varun Badola as Vivek's friend
Shefali Rana as Badi Massi

References

External links

The Middle (TV series)
2015 Indian television series debuts
2015 Indian television series endings
Indian television series based on American television series
Hindi-language television shows
Indian television sitcoms
Big Magic original programming